Kenyamyidae is an extinct family of rodents from Africa that lived in the Lower Miocene era.

There are two genera in the family, Kenyamys and Simonymys, both described by Lavocat in 1973. There are two species of Kenyamys, K. mariae and K. williamsi. There is only one species of Simonymys, S. genovefae.

References 

Hystricognath rodents
Prehistoric rodent families
Taxa named by René Lavocat
Miocene first appearances
Miocene extinctions